The Lebanon Express was a weekly newspaper in Lebanon, Oregon. It was owned by Lee Enterprises. The paper ceased publication in January 2023.

History 
Founded on March 5, 1887, the paper published every Wednesday. The paper published its final edition on Jan. 18, 2023 and rolled coverage of the area into The Albany Democrat-Herald.

References

External links
 
 

1887 establishments in Oregon
Lebanon, Oregon
Lee Enterprises publications
Newspapers published in Oregon
Oregon Newspaper Publishers Association
Newspapers established in 1887
Weekly newspapers published in the United States

Defunct newspapers published in Oregon
2023 disestablishments in Oregon